The women's javelin throw event at the 1986 World Junior Championships in Athletics was held in Athens, Greece, at Olympic Stadium on 18 and 19 July.  An old specification 600g javelin was used.

Medalists

Results

Final
19 July

Qualifications
18 Jul

Group A

Participation
According to an unofficial count, 21 athletes from 15 countries participated in the event.

References

Javelin throw
Javelin throw at the World Athletics U20 Championships